Terry P. Pinkard (born 1947) is an American philosopher. He is a University Professor at Georgetown University. His research and teaching focus on the German tradition in philosophy from Kant to the present.

Education and career 

Pinkard earned his BA and MA from the University of Texas at Austin and his Ph.D. from Stony Brook University. He taught at Georgetown University from 1975 to 2000, at Northwestern University from 2000 to 2005, but returned to Georgetown in 2005.

Publications

Books 
 Power, Practice, and Forms of Life: Sartre's Appropriation of Hegel and Marx. University of Chicago Press, 2021.
 Georg Wilhelm Friedrich Hegel: The Phenomenology of Spirit (Cambridge Hegel Translations), translated by Terry Pinkard (Cambridge University Press, 2018) 
 Does History Make Sense?. Harvard University Press, 2017.
 Hegel's naturalism: mind, nature, and the final ends of life. (New York, NY [u.a.], 2012)
 Liberal rights and liberal individualism without liberalism: agency and recognition (2007)
 German Philosophy 1760-1860: The Legacy of Idealism. Cambridge: Cambridge University Press, 2002.
 Hegel: A Biography. Cambridge: Cambridge University Press, 2000.
 Hegel's Phenomenology: The Sociality of Reason. Cambridge: Cambridge University Press, 1994.
 Hegel's Dialectic: The Explanation of Possibility. Temple University Press, 1988.
 Democratic Liberalism and Social Union. Temple University Press, 1987.

Articles in Journals 
"Perché leggere la 'Fenomenologia' duecento anni dopo?." Filosofia e discussione pubblica, 3 (2007)
"Las Formas de Vida según Hegel." Apuntes Filosóficos, 15, 29 (2006)
"Response to Stern and Snow." Bulletin of the Hegel Society of Great Britain (2004)
"Subjects, Objects, and Normativity: What Is It Like To Be an Agent?." Internationales Jahrbuch des Deutschen Idealismus / International Yearbook Of German Idealism (2003)
"Virtues, Morality, and Sittlichkeit: From Maxims to Practices, Or: Using Kant to Get Out of Kant (and Using Hegel to Get Out of Hegel)." European Journal of Philosophy, 7, 2 (1999)

Articles and Chapters in Books 
 "Freedom and the Lifeworld." Hegel on Action, Palgrave Macmillan, 2012.
 "Hegel and Marx: Ethics and Practice." Oxford Handbook of the History of Ethics, Oxford University Press, 2012.
 "Social Conditions of Philosophy in the Nineteenth Century." Cambridge Companion to Nineteenth Century Philosophy, Cambridge University Press, 2012.
 "Hegel’s Non-Analytic Option." Hegel and Analytic Philosophy, Northwestern University Press, 2009.
 "Norms, Facts, and the Philosophy of History." History as Philosophy: Essays on Kant's Idea for a Universal History, Cambridge University Press, 2009.
 "Shapes of Active Reason: The Law of the Heart, Retrieved Virtue, and What Really Matters." The Blackwell Guide to Hegel's Phenomenology of Spirit, Wiley-Blackwell, 2009.
 "Autorität und Kunst-Religion." Hegels Phänomenologie: Ein kooperativer Kommentar zu einem Schlüsselwerk der Moderne, Frankfurt: Suhrkamp Verlag, 2008.
 "Hegel: A Life." Hegel and Nineteenth Century Philosophy, Cambridge University Press, 2008.
 "Hegelianism in the Twentieth Century." Routledge Encyclopedia of Twentieth Century Philosophy, Routledge, 2008.
 "What Is a Shape of Spirit?." Hegel's Phenomenology at 200, Cambridge University Press, 2008.
 "Eduard Gans, Heinrich Heine und Hegels Philosophie der Geschichte." Hegelianismus und Saint-Simonismus, Mentis Verlag, 2007.
 "Liberal Rights and Liberal Individualism Without Liberalism: Agency and Recognition." German Idealism: Contemporary Perspectives, London: Routledge, 2007.
 "Symbolic, Classical, and Romantic Art." Hegel and Art, Northwestern University Press, 2007.
 "Was Pragmatism the Successor to Idealism?." The New Pragmatists, Oxford University Press, 2007.
 "Sellars the Post-Kantian?." The Self-Correcting Enterprise: Essays on Wilfrid Sellars, Amsterdam: Rodopi, 2006.
 "Speculative Naturphilosophie and the Development of the Empirical Sciences: Hegel’s Perspective." Continental Philosophy of Science, Wiley-Blackwell, 2005.
 "Innen, Außen, und Lebensformen: Hegel und Wittgenstein." Hegels Erbe, Suhrkamp, 2004.
 "Reason, Recognition and Historicity." Subjektivität und Anerkennung, Mentis Verlag, 2004.
 "Agency, Finitude, and Idealism: What Does It Mean to be a Hegelian Today?." Das Interesse des Denkens: Hegel aus heutiger Sicht, Wilhelm Fink Verlag, 2003.
 "Der sich selbst vollbringende Skeptizismus und das Leben in der Moderne." Skepsis und literarische Imagination, München: Wilhelm Fink, 2003.
 "MacIntyre’s Critique of Modernity." Alasdair MacIntyre, Cambridge University Press, 2003.
 "Objektivität und Wahrheit innerhalb einer subjektiven Logik." Der Begriff als die Wahrheit: Zum Anspruch der Hegelschen „Subjektiven Logik, Schönigh, 2003.
 "Taylor, History and the History of Philosophy." Charles Taylor, Cambridge University Press, 2003.
 "Contingency and Necessity in History: Rethinking Hegel." Die Weltgeschichte – Das Weltgericht?, Klett-Cotta, 2001.
 "Hegel’s Phenomenology and Logic: An Overview." Cambridge Companion to German Idealism, Cambridge University Press, 2000.

Notes

External links

 Terry Pinkard on Georgetown University
 Terry Pinkard on PhilPapers

Hegelian philosophers
Living people
20th-century American philosophers
21st-century American philosophers
1947 births